Isaac Humphrey Snowden (1826–1869) was one of the first three African-American students admitted to Harvard Medical School, in 1850, along with Martin Delany and Daniel Laing, Jr.  Snowden and Laing were sponsored by the American Colonization Society in doing so and had previously been connected with the Young Men's Literary Society in Boston.

After being at Harvard for a time white students protested the admission of black students, and Snowden and the two other black students were removed from the school.  Snowden then studied with a surgeon at Massachusetts General Hospital and unsuccessfully tried to re-enter Harvard in 1853.

In 1854, after completing his medical education, Snowden sailed for Liberia on the ship Sophia Walke to serve in Sinou County. He died in Liberia in 1869.

Sources

.
A Study of Black Intellectual and Literary Societies in Antebellum Boston

Harvard Medical School alumni
1826 births
1869 deaths